Sar Rig (also Romanized as Sar Rīg) is a village in Nakhlestan Rural District, in the Central District of Kahnuj County, Kerman Province, Iran. At the 2006 census, its population was 787, in 172 families.

References 

Populated places in Kahnuj County